Marily dos Santos (born 5 February 1978) is a Brazilian marathon runner. Aged 30 she made her Olympic debut, placing 51st in the 2008 Olympic marathon in a time of 2:38:10. She finished fifth at the 2015 Pan American Games and 78th at the 2016 Rio Olympics.

In professional competition, she was the 2012 winner at the Maratona di Sant'Antonio in Italy. She has won numerous road running competitions in Brazil, with highlights including the 2007 Rio de Janeiro Marathon, the 2008 Brasilia Half Marathon and two victories at the Corrida de São Sebastião.

She has also competed in cross country running and was the short race bronze medallist at the 2002 South American Cross Country Championships and sixth placer and team title winner at the 2005 South American Cross Country Championships. She represented Brazil at the 2003 IAAF World Half Marathon Championships.

Personal life
Dos Santos is coached by her husband Gilmario Mendes. Her cousin José Santana placed second in the marathon at the 1991 Pan American Games.

References

External links

Profile – UOL Esporte 
NBC 2008 Olympics profile

1978 births
Living people
Sportspeople from Alagoas
Brazilian female long-distance runners
Brazilian female marathon runners
Olympic athletes of Brazil
Athletes (track and field) at the 2008 Summer Olympics
Athletes (track and field) at the 2016 Summer Olympics
Pan American Games athletes for Brazil
Athletes (track and field) at the 2015 Pan American Games
21st-century Brazilian women
20th-century Brazilian women